William Ewart Gladstone (1809–1898) was a British Liberal and earlier conservative politician, and four-time prime minister.

William Gladstone may also refer to:

 William Henry Gladstone (1840–1892), British MP and classical musician, eldest son of William Ewart Gladstone
 Will Gladstone (1885–1915), British MP later killed in the First World War, son of the above
 Sir William Gladstone, 7th Baronet (1925–2018), Chief Scout of the United Kingdom, great-grandson of William Ewart Gladstone